Grant Township is a township in Montgomery County, Iowa, USA.

History
Grant Township was formed in 1868.

References

Townships in Montgomery County, Iowa
Townships in Iowa